Mohammad Javed Ali is a medical scientist at Govindram Seksaria Institute of Dacryology, L. V. Prasad Eye Institute, Hyderabad specialising in dacryology, the science of tear ducts. He is also Hong-Leong Professor at University of Singapore and Professor at Friedrich Alexander University, Nuremberg, Germany. He obtained MS degree in ophthalmology in 2007 from NTR University of Health Sciences and PhD degree from University of Hyderabad.

Honours and awards
Mohammed Javed Ali was awarded the Shanti Swarup Bhatnagar Prize for Science and Technology in Medical Sciences in the year 2020 for his contributions in the field of dacryology. The other many honours and awards received by him include:
Lester T Jones Award, American Society of Ophthalmic Plastics and Reconstructive Society (2020)
Experienced Alexander Von Humboldt Research Fellowship Award, Alexander von Humboldt Foundation (2016)
Merrill-Reeh Award, American Society of Ophthalmic Plastics and Reconstructive Surgery (2015)
Fellow, Royal College of General Practitioners (FRCGP) (2003)
Fellow, Royal College of Physicians and Surgeons of Glasgow (2008)

References

External links

Contemplating Dacryology

Recipients of the Shanti Swarup Bhatnagar Award in Medical Science
Indian medical researchers
Year of birth missing (living people)
Living people